The Nunda, Eater of People is an abridged version of a Swahili fairy tale titled "Sultan Majnun", collected by Edward Steere (1828–1882) in Swahili Tales, as told by natives of Zanzibar (1870). Andrew Lang included it in The Violet Fairy Book (1901).

It is Aarne-Thompson type 550, the quest for the golden bird/firebird.

Synopsis
A Sultan was very proud of his garden and of six of his seven sons, but he scorned the youngest son as weak.  One day, he saw that his date tree was ready to fruit; he sent his oldest sons to watch it, or the slaves would steal the fruit and he would have none for many a year.  The son had his slaves beat drums to keep him awake, but when it grew light they slept and a bird ate all the dates.  Every year after that, he set a different son and finally two sons but for five years the bird ate the dates.  The sixth year, he sent a man of his. His youngest son asked why he did not send him.  Finally the father agreed. The youngest went, sent his slaves home and slept until early. Then he sat with corn in one hand and sand in the other.  He chewed on the corn until he grew sleepy and then he put sand in his mouth, which kept him awake.

The bird arrived.  He grabbed it.  It flew off with him, but he did not let go, even when it threatened him. In return for its freedom, the bird gave him a feather and said if the son put it in a fire, the bird would come wherever he was. The son returned, and the dates were still there. There was much rejoicing.

One day, the sultan's cat caught a calf and the sultan refused compensation on the grounds that technically he owned both. The next day it caught a cow, and then a donkey, a horse, and a child and then a man. Finally it lived in a thicket and ate whatever went by but the sultan would still not entertain any complaints. One day, the sultan went out to see the harvest with his six sons and the cat sprang out and killed three. The sultan demanded its death, admitting it was a demon.

Against his desperate parent's wishes, the youngest son set out after the cat, which was called "The Nunda (Eater of People)" and could not find it for many days. Finally, he and his slaves tracked it over a mountain, through a great forest. The prince and slaves threw spears into it and ran away. The next day they carried it back to the town. The people and Sultan rejoiced because they had been delivered from the bondage of fear.

Versions
The tale was also collected in Zanzibar, with the name Mkaaah Jeechonee, the Boy Hunter: his father is Sultan Maaj'noon and the huge cat is called Noondah. This version skips the episode with the bird and focuses on the hunt for the king's giant feline.

Another translation of the tale was Nunda the Slayer and the origin of the One-Eyed, whose source is reportedly from the Swahili language. This version lacks the introductory part with the bird and begins with the Sultan feeding his pet cat until he grows large enough.

Analysis
Professor Alice Werner suggested the first part of the tale might have been a foreign importation. In regards to the Nunda (es), she compared it to a series of stories from other African peoples about "The Swallowing Monster" that grows larger with each thing it devours and/or is capable of eating entire villages. The word nunda is also said to mean 'fierce animal', 'cruel man' or 'something heavy'.

It appears to be a creature of large size, possibly a giant cat.

The second part of the tale sometimes exists as an independent story, such as the version Hadisi ya nunda, collected and published by German linguist .

Edward Steere noted the resemblance of the hero's name, Sit-in-the-kitchen, with Cinderella, another folktale character that sits in the ashes.

See also
Tsarevitch Ivan, the Fire Bird and the Gray Wolf
The Nine Peahens and the Golden Apples
The Golden Mermaid
The Golden Bird
Simurgh

References

External links

Nunda, Eater of People, Audio Version''

Nunda, Eater of People
Fictional birds
ATU 500-559
Edward Steere